Roßwein is a town in the district of Mittelsachsen, Saxony, Germany.

References

External links
Official Roßwein website

Mittelsachsen